Fitiuta Airport  is a public airport located in Fiti‘uta, a village on the island of Ta‘ū in American Samoa, an unincorporated territory of the United States. Fitiuta Airport replaced Tau Airport (located in the village of Tau), which was officially deactivated after the construction and activation of Fitiuta Airport in 1990. The Fitiuta airport is owned by the Government of American Samoa.

Although most U.S. airports are assigned the same three-letter location identifier by both the FAA and IATA, Fitiuta Airport is assigned FAQ by the FAA and FTI by the IATA (which assigned FAQ to Frieda River Airport in Papua New Guinea). The airport's ICAO identifier is NSFQ.

Facilities and aircraft 
Fitiuta Airport has one paved runway designated 12/30 which measures . For 12-month period ending May 29, 2015, the airport had 1,130 aircraft operations (an average of 3 per day), 100% of which were air taxi flights. Fitiuta airport also has a fully functioning fire-crash station (activated in 2011), lighted runway and operates as a Part 139 airport.

Airlines and destinations

References

External links 
 National Park Service map of the Manu‘a Islands showing location of Fiti‘uta village and airport on the island of Ta‘ū.
 Resources for this airport:
 
 
 

Airports in American Samoa